The Blue Crane Route Local Municipality council consists of eleven members elected by mixed-member proportional representation. Six councillors are elected by first-past-the-post voting in six wards, while the remaining five are chosen from party lists so that the total number of party representatives is proportional to the number of votes received. In the election of 1 November 2021 the African National Congress (ANC) won a reduced majority of six seats.

Results 
The following table shows the composition of the council after past elections.

December 2000 election

The following table shows the results of the 2000 election.

October 2002 floor crossing

In terms of the Eighth Amendment of the Constitution and the judgment of the Constitutional Court in United Democratic Movement v President of the Republic of South Africa and Others, in the period from 8–22 October 2002 councillors had the opportunity to cross the floor to a different political party without losing their seats. In the Blue Crane Route council, one councillor crossed from the Democratic Alliance (DA) to the New National Party (NNP), which had formerly been part of the DA.

By-elections from October 2002 to March 2006
The following by-elections were held to fill vacant ward seats in the period between the floor crossing period in October 2002 and the election in March 2006.

March 2006 election

The following table shows the results of the 2006 election.

May 2011 election

The following table shows the results of the 2011 election.

August 2016 election

The following table shows the results of the 2016 election.

By-elections from August 2016 to November 2021
The following by-elections were held to fill vacant ward seats in the period between the elections in August 2016 and November 2021.

November 2021 election

The following table shows the results of the 2021 election.

By-elections from November 2021
The following by-elections were held to fill vacant ward seats in the period since November 2021.

In ward 2, existing DA councillor Archer Heynse's membership was terminated for not settling outstanding 2021 election fees. He applied to have his membership reinstated and again represented the DA, holding onto his seat by 10 votes over the ANC, in what was seen to be a safe seat, with a 25% margin in the 2021 elections.

In ward 5, where the DA had won the ward for the first time in 2021, the councillor also had his membership terminated, but did not stand again. Lorraine Johnson narrowly held on to the marginal seat for the party.

References

Blue Crane Route
Elections in the Eastern Cape
Sarah Baartman District Municipality